Bodega  may refer to:

 A convenience store, in general
Bodega (store), in American English referring primarily to convenience stores in the New York metropolitan area
 A warehouse
 A winery
 A wine bar
 A wine cellar

Places in the United States
 Bodega, California, a town in Sonoma County
 Bodega Bay, California, a town in Sonoma County
 Bodega Bay, a Pacific Ocean inlet on the northern California coast

Other uses
Bodega (Scottish band)
 Bodega (Canadian band)
Bodega (American band)
 Bodega (bagpipe), an instrument from southern France
 Bodega (company), an American vending machine manufacturer
Bodega Band, a Norwegian jazz orchestra
Bodega Bud Brand, an online Streetwear brand based Lawrence, MA.